Photolateralis is a genus of marine ray-finned fishes, ponyfish from the family Leiognathidae. This genus is unique among ponyfishes in possessing a translucent mid-lateral flank stripe which, depending on the species, may be either a composite stripe of numerous independent translucent windows or a continuous translucent lateral stripe.

Species
There are 3 recognized species in this genus:
 Photolateralis antongil (Sparks, 2006)
 Photolateralis moretoniensis (J. D. Ogilby, 1912) (Moreton Bay ponyfish)
 Photolateralis stercorarius (Evermann & Seale, 1907) (Oblong slipmouth)

References

Leiognathidae
Bioluminescent fish
Taxa named by Prosanta Chakrabarty
Ray-finned fish genera